Sérgio Gabriel Rito Paulico (born 4 April 1991 in Covilhã) is a Portuguese footballer who plays for S.C. Covilhã, as a midfielder.

See also
Football in Portugal
List of football clubs in Portugal

References

External links
 

1991 births
Living people
People from Covilhã
Portuguese footballers
Association football midfielders
S.C. Covilhã players
Sportspeople from Castelo Branco District